S. Pattabiraman was an Indian politician and former Member of the Legislative Assembly of Tamil Nadu. He was elected to the Tamil Nadu legislative assembly from Tiruvallur constituency as an Anna Dravida Munnetra Kazhagam candidate in 1977, 1980, and 1984 elections.

References 

He was one of the most popular member in the MGR Government. He was highly revered in his constituency and the only one to three consecutive elections in the Tiruvellore constituency, considered to be a swing seat between ADMK and DMK.

Living people
Year of birth missing (living people)
All India Anna Dravida Munnetra Kazhagam politicians
Tamil Nadu MLAs 1985–1989